Kulgam, known as Kolgom in Kashmiri, is a town, an administrative division and capital of the Kulgam district in the Indian union territory of Jammu and Kashmir. The city is divided into 16 electoral wards that has a population of 23,584, of which 12,605 are males while 10,979 are females.

Geography
The partial excavation of an archaeological site in a nearby village called Kutbal has yielded cultural material from the period of Kushan rule in the region. Stamped tiles, which were excavated from the site, indicated the taste and living standard of the population. "These excavations speak of high culture, civic sense, social norms and art of the people living in first century AD."

Demographics
 Indian census, Kulgam had a population of 23,584. There were 12,605 males (53%) and 10,979 females (47%). Of the population, 3,353 (14.2%) were age 0-6: 1,787 males (53%) and 1,566 females (47%).  The literacy rate for the people over six was 69.2% (males 80.7%, females 56.1%).

Sightseeing

Kulgam is located about 68 km from Srinagar and about 17 km from Anantnag.  It is connected with its neighboring districts like Shopian, Pulwama,  Anantnag, Ramban etc. through roads besides being linked with far flung areas of the District by a dependable road network. Apart from places of spiritual interest the district also has tourist spots like the Ahrabal waterfall on Veshaw River, Amnoo Eid Gah which is a place of sight-seeing in the extreme south-west of district Kulgam, Kongwattan and Gurwattan ahead of Ahrabal,  Charenbal and Nandimarg high land pastures are also places of tourist attraction apart from virgin meadows in the area  from Kund to Ladigasan (ahead of Aherbal clefts). The District also has  super abundance of natural water resources in the shape of various famous springs such as, Kausar Nag (ahead of  Aherbal), Waseknag (Kund), Khee Nag (Khee Jogipora), qaimoh nag (qaimoh) etc.

Transport

Road

Kulgam has following roads connecting it to various assembly segments and with NH1A (Major District Roads)
 Anantnag-Ashmuji-Brazloo-Kulgam Main Road
 Kulgam-Chawalgam-Muhammad Pra - Shopian Road
 Wanpoh-Qaimoh-Kulgam Road
 NH1A Mirbazar to Kulgam via Akhran, Hablishi, Kilam,  Pirpora & brazloo
 Qaimoh-Kadder-Hanjan-Shopian Road
 Bijbehara-Arwani-Frisal-Yaripora Bugam-Kulgam Road
 Qazigund-Devsar-Pahloo-brazloo-Kulgam Road
 Kulgam-Shopian Road
 Kulgam-Nehama-Aharabal Road
 Kulgam-Damhal—Aharabal Road
 Kulgam-Damhal- Aharabal Road
 Kulgam-Ardigatnoo-Laisoo Road
 Kulgam-Laisoo-Damhal Hanjipora Road
 Khudwani-Frisal-Zainpora Road
 Frisal-Damidallah-Buchroo Road
 Frisal-Kralchek-Nagharad road
 Frisal- Nawbal-Shamsipora-Batingoo Road

Rail
Kulgam is not accessible through railway. The nearest railway stations are Anantnag railway station and Qazigund railway station located at distances of 4 and 10-20 kilometers respectively.

Air
Kulgam doesn't have its own airport the nearest airport is Srinagar International Airport located at a distance of 85 kilometres.

Health
 District Hospital Kulgam 
 Sub district hospitals at Yaripora and D. H Pora.
 24x7 Emergency Hospital Qazigund [Medically some areas of Qazigund are under Kulgam]
 PHCs at Frisal, Qaimoh, Bugam, Pahloo, Devsar, Behibagh Mohammad Pora, Katrsoo, Kilam, Akhran, GB Khalil, KB-pora, Nehama etc.

Photo Gallery

See also
Chiranbal
 Kausar Nag
Aharbal
Anantnag
Chowgam
Shopian
Ramban

References

Major Places